The 1985–86 Northern Premier League season was the 18th in the history of the Northern Premier League, a football competition in England. It was known as the Mulipart Premier League for sponsorship reasons.

Overview
The League featured twenty-two clubs.

Team changes
The following two clubs left the League at the end of the previous season:
Stafford Rangers promoted to Alliance Premier League
Grantham relegated to Southern League Midland Division

The following two clubs joined the League at the start of the season:
Gateshead relegated from Alliance Premier League
Caernarfon Town promoted from North West Counties League Division One

League table

Results

Cup Results
Challenge Cup:

Hyde United bt. Marine

President's Cup:

Worksop Town 3–2 Burton Albion

Northern Premier League Shield: Between Champions of NPL Premier Division and Winners of the NPL Cup.

Hyde United 2–4 Gateshead

End of the season
At the end of the eighteenth season of the Northern Premier League, Gateshead applied to join the Football Conference and were successful.

Promotion and relegation
The following club left the League at the end of the season:
Gateshead promoted to Football Conference

The following club joined the League the following season:
Barrow relegated from Alliance Premier League

References

External links
 Northern Premier League Tables at RSSSF

Northern Premier League seasons
6